The North Northallerton bridge is a road bridge straddling the Northallerton–Eaglescliffe railway line in Northallerton, North Yorkshire, England. The bridge is on a link road connecting the A167 in the west, and the A684 in the east and in part, is intended to provide relief for the congestion caused in Northallerton due to the many level crossings which hold up road traffic. The link road runs through a set of new housing estates between Northallerton and Brompton, and has been beset by delays, originally intended for opening in late 2021, it was opened on 16 December 2022.

History 
The bridge was granted approval in 2015, though objections to the whole project, including the two housing estates, saw a delay in final approvals until 2016. Work was due to start in April 2017, with an original opening date of 2019. However, it was only in July 2020 that work was actually initiated, with a revised opening timeline of late 2021 for its opening. The bridge and link road were approved to provide relief from congestion in Northallerton town due to the railway lines in the town having several level crossings which lead to traffic tailbacks, especially at Low Gates, a crossing guarding the A167 to Darlington. The bridge is part of a link road through two housing estates (which will consist of 900 dwellings), which has been jointly developed by Persimmon and Taylor-Wimpey. The two housing estates are separated by a railway line, and a stream. The decision to locate the bridge at the point where the stream and the railway are adjacent to each other was taken to lower the cost of the bridge, and so it could have a shorter span.

The Bridge straddles both the Northallerton to Eaglescliffe railway line and Brompton Beck/North Beck, and provides a link between the A167 to Darlington (Darlington Road), and the A684 (Stokesley Road) to the A19 trunk road. The construction has been beset by delays due to the COVID-19 pandemic and also that an incorrect membrane had been laid under tarmac, which then had to be all ripped up and started again.

The bridge was opened on 16 December 2022.

Details 
With preparatory works completed, the bridge was lowered into position in September 2021. The cost of the whole link road is £12 million, with £7.6 million being spent on the bridge alone.

Notes

References

Sources

External links 
North Yorks Plan
Eric Wright Group builders page

Bridges completed in 2022
Road bridges in England
2022 establishments in England
Northallerton
Bridges in North Yorkshire